Arvid Møller (14 October 1939 – 26 September 2020) was a Norwegian journalist and non-fiction writer, born in Strinda. Having worked as journalist for various newspapers, he was eventually assigned with NRK for about forty years. In addition to these assignments, he wrote more than one hundred books, many of them biographies of well known and lesser known people.

Career
Born in Strinda on 14 October 1939, Møller grew up in Voss.

From 1959 onwards Møller worked as journalist for the newspapers Gula Tidend, Fredrikstad Blad, Gudbrandsdølen, Lillehammer Tilskuer and Dagningen. From 1969 he was appointed as journalist at NRK's regional office in Lillehammer, where he worked for about forty years.

Møller wrote more than hundred books, including biographies of the artists Frans Widerberg, Kåre Tveter, Olav Mosebekk, Per Ung and Harald Kihle, skier Håkon Brusveen, missionary Annie Skau Berntsen, politician John Alvheim, Queen Maud, Princess Märtha, Norwegian-Canadian skiing pioneer Herman Smith-Johannsen, as well as biographies of "ordinary people" and local legends. He also wrote books on other subjects, including nature and art.

He was awarded Austmannaprisen in 1969. In 2000, he received a cultural prize for Gudbrandsdalen. In 2005, he was awarded the King's Medal of Merit in gold.

Møller died at Lillehammer on 26 or 27 September 2020.

Selected works

References

1939 births
2020 deaths
People from Trondheim
Norwegian journalists 
NRK people
Norwegian non-fiction writers
Norwegian biographers
Norwegian nature writers
Art writers
Recipients of the King's Medal of Merit in gold